Justice Berry may refer to:

Janis M. Berry (fl. 1960s–2000s), associate justice of the Massachusetts Appeals Court
John M. Berry (1827–1887), associate justice of the Minnesota Supreme Court
Thornton G. Berry Jr. (1904–1987), associate justice of the Supreme Court of Appeals of West Virginia
William A. Berry (judge) (1915–2004), associate justice of the Oklahoma Supreme Court

See also 
Judge Berry (disambiguation)